is a video game character created by SNK. He makes his first appearance in the fighting game Fatal Fury: King of Fighters as one of the three playable characters from the game. The Fatal Fury series introduce Joe as a goofy Muay Thai fighter who enters the King of Fighters tournament along with the Bogard brothers (Terry and Andy) in order to defeat the host Geese Howard to take revenge for the death of Terry and Andy's father. In the meantime, Joe also seeks to fight new rivals through the tournament and keep practicing Muay Thai. Joe is also a recurring character in The King of Fighters series, as part of the Fatal Fury Team initially composed of Joe, Terry and Andy. He was also added to the crossover Capcom vs. SNK Pro along with the sequel Capcom vs. SNK 2. Apart from the video games, Joe has also appeared in the animated films from the Fatal Fury series which retell the story from the games. His character has been well received by gamers, appearing in several popularity polls developed by video games journals and website. He has also become a mascot from the Neo Geo Freak journal. Video games publications have liked Joe's character, having noted his gameplay and development in games. Though he is preceded by Sagat as the first Muay Thai character in fighting games, he is notable as the first Muay Thai fighter to be playable.

Attributes
Although Joe's place of origin is Japan, he spent the majority of his time in Thailand, where he trained Muay Thai. It was through his victories that Joe got the nickname "Hurricane Upper" Joe Higashi. Joe earned his title as the champion of Muay Thai by beating Hwa Jai in a Muay Thai only tournament. Hwa Jai later joined the King of Fighters tournament in order to exact revenge against Joe but failed and after admitting his defeat they're good friends and sparring partners. Ever since then, Joe has been defending his title against lesser opponents. At first, Joe was a stoic character who lived for fighting and training. As time passed, he becomes a pretty goofy man who self proclaims himself to be a genius with mostly everything. He does not take battle as serious as the Bogards, but he loves to fight.

Appearances

In video games
Joe first appears in Fatal Fury: King of Fighters as one of the three playable characters along with Andy and Terry Bogard. The plot features Joe allying with the Bogard brothers to enter the King of Fighters tournament and then defeat the host Geese Howard, who killed the Bogard brothers' father. In the tournament, Joe also beats his Muay Thai rival Hwa Jai, and they both become friends. In Fatal Fury 2, Joe learns that Hwa Jai was beaten by the new King of Fighters host Wolfgang Krauser and enters the tournament to avenge him. Fatal Fury 3: Road to the Final Victory and Real Bout Fatal Fury end the fight between Joe and the Bogard and Geese, who dies falling from the Geese Tower. The two following games, Real Bout Fatal Fury Special and Real Bout Fatal Fury 2: The Newcomers also feature Joe as a playable character but none of them contain a storyline. Fatal Fury: Wild Ambition retells the events from the first game, but with characters who would appear later.

In The King of Fighters series, Joe is a regular member from the Fatal Fury Team (also composed of Terry and Andy), and each game features them entering into an annual tournament to search for competition. Andy's girlfriend Mai Shiranui, joins them in The King of Fighters '99 since the tournament now requires four members per team. By The King of Fighters 2000 and The King of Fighters 2001, Mai leaves and the new fourth member is Blue Mary. The King of Fighters 2002 and The King of Fighters 2003 return the tournament to use teams of three members, but in the latter pro-wrestler Tizoc replaces Andy, who is busy taking care of his sick student. By The King of Fighters XI, Joe leaves the competition as he enters into a new Muay Thai tournament. However, he returns in The King of Fighters XII, which neither features official teams or plot. The sequel casts Joe back into the classic Fatal Fury team that includes Terry and Andy, the reason being Terry's desire to reunite the original team to participate in the upcoming tournament. In the spin-off The King of Fighters Kyo, the player (who uses Kyo Kusanagi) can challenge Joe to a fight in a game, and also make him join to his team for the upcoming King of Fighters tournament. Joe also takes a minor role in The King of Fighters EX as an assistant character (dubbed "Striker") for the Fatal Fury Team, now composed with the Bogard brothers and Mai. Additionally, he stars in The King of Fighters Neowave with the original Fatal Fury Team. He was also added to the crossover game Capcom vs. SNK Pro, an updated version of Capcom vs. SNK: Millennium Fight 2000 for the PlayStation and Sega Dreamcast, and in the sequel Capcom vs. SNK 2. He is also present the otome game King of Fighters for Girls. Joe appears in Super Smash Bros. Ultimate as a background character at King of Fighters Stadium.

In other media
Joe Higashi appears in each of the three animated films from Fatal Fury. Jason Gray-Stanford provides the voice of Joe in the English versions. Masaaki Satake provides the voice of Joe in the Japanese version of the first film and Nobuyuki Hiyama in the two following. In the Fatal Fury: Legend of the Hungry Wolf from 1993, Joe enters the King of Fighters tournament along with the Bogard brothers which cause Geese Howard to attack them. Upon learning that Andy and Terry's teacher, Tung Fu Rue, was seriously injured by Geese's right-hand man, Billy Kane, Andy and Joe set to fight Geese. None of them are able to defeat Geese, but are saved by Terry who later defeats Geese. In the 1993 film Fatal Fury 2: The New Battle, Joe becomes ashamed after learning that Terry became depressed after being defeated by Wolfgang Krauser and tries to avenge him. However, he ends up being heavily wounded by Krauser. In Fatal Fury: The Motion Picture from 1994 Joe joins Terry, Andy and Mai into helping a girl named Sulia into stopping her brother Laocorn Gaudeamus, who is the main antagonist from the film.

Reception
The character of Joe has been well received by gamers, having ranked high in several popularity polls. In Gamest's 1997 Heroes Collection, Joe was voted as the staff's thirty-ninth favorite character. He shared the spot with four other characters, including Fatal Fury character, Jin Chonrei, and Street Fighter character, Zangief. In the character popularity poll on Neo Geo Freak's website, he was voted as the second favorite character with a total of 3,654 votes. The character of Joe also became Neo Geo Freak's main mascot for reviews and new regarding games from SNK. For the special endings in The King of Fighters '97, three video games journals, Gamest, Famitsu and Neo Geo Freak, had to create a team composed of three characters from the game so that they would be featured in an image after passing the arcade mode. The Gamest's team created a team composed of Terry Bogard, Blue Mary and Joe. The special ending only appears in Japanese versions of the game.

Video games publications have commented on Joe's character, adding praise and criticism to his traits and development. Joe has been noted to have similar moveset to Andy and Terry in the first Fatal Fury game by Spanner Spencer from Eurogamer. Instead, IGN reviewer Lucas M. Thomas commented that Joe is the most unusual of the three characters playable in the game, noting his Thai boxing  fighting style and its effects. Harry Slater from Acegamez agreed on this, noting Joe's gameplay to be more destructive and slower than the ones from the Bogard. Gamezone writer Eduardo Zacarias has also found that Joe is a good example of the large number of variations of special moves each character has in latter games from the series, noting Joe to be "the master of the powerful TNT Punch". His absence in The King of Fighters XI has been complained by Luke Albiges from Eurogamer, who added it is curious how he was removed from the game despite being a popular character within gamers. Den of Geek also listed him as the 18th best The King of Fighters characters with the writer praising his techniques as well as the multiple relationships he developed across the series.

Hip Hop artist Del the Funky Homosapien made a song titled "King of Fighters" in which the cocky protagonist rapping claims to be called "Joe Higashi" and, through an onslaught of taunts, threatens to use moves like "Tiger Kick" and "Hurricane Uppercut" (both Specials on the characters move list).

Various merchandise of the character has been created, including figures.

References

Fatal Fury characters
Fictional Japanese people in video games
Fictional martial artists in video games
Fictional male martial artists
Fictional Muay Thai practitioners
Male characters in video games
The King of Fighters characters
Video game characters introduced in 1991